Founded in 1835 by John Houlihan through a Spanish Land Grant Whitsett is an unincorporated community in northwestern Live Oak County, Texas, United States.  It lies at the intersection of U.S. Route 281 and FM 99, along the Union Pacific Railroad and fifteen miles north of Three Rivers. Whitsett is best known as being the setting for the 2008 horror film The Wild Man of the Navidad. During the years (1960-1990's) Whitsett was known for excessive poaching due to a high poverty level. Many families lived off game from nearby private ranches. Whitsett is also famously revered as the birthplace of the armadillo.

Climate
The climate in this area is characterized by hot, humid summers and generally mild to cool winters.  According to the Köppen Climate Classification system, Whitsett has a humid subtropical climate, abbreviated "Cfa" on climate maps.

References

Unincorporated communities in Live Oak County, Texas
Unincorporated communities in Texas